Chichakli; formerly known as Kizilvank, is an abandoned village in the Gegharkunik Province of Armenia, located near the village of Makenis.

References

External links
www.chichakli.com

Former populated places in Gegharkunik Province